Arthur Kaluma is an Ugandan–American college basketball player for Creighton Bluejays.

Early life and high school
Kaluma grew up in Irving, Texas and initially attended Universal Academy. He transferred to Dream City Christian School in Glendale, Arizona prior to his junior year. Kaluma was rated a four-star recruit and initially signed to play at UNLV, but was released from his National Letter of Intent following the departure of head coach T. J. Otzelberger. He ultimately committed to play at Creighton over offers from Arizona, Western Kentucky, and Syracuse.

College career
Kaluma was named a starter entering his freshman season at Creighton. He finished the season averaging 10.4 points and 5.4 rebounds per game. Kaluma entered his sophomore season on the watch list for the Karl Malone Award.

International career
Kaluma became a Ugandan citizen in 2020. He played for the Uganda men's national basketball team in AfroBasket 2021. Kaluma also joined the team to play in 2023 FIBA Basketball World Cup qualifiers.

References

External links
Creighton Bluejays bio

Living people
American men's basketball players
Basketball players from Arizona
Creighton Bluejays men's basketball players
Power forwards (basketball)
Year of birth missing (living people)